Austonio is an unincorporated community, formerly a city, in Houston County, Texas, United States.

The community, originally named Pearville, was established before 1900. In 1930, the community sponsored a contest, asking participants to select a new name for the community. Ruth Tucker submitted the name "Austonio", a combination of Austin and San Antonio; the name was chosen as the community's new name. Austonio has an estimated population of about 40.

Education
Most of Austonio is within the Lovelady Independent School District.  A small portion north/northeast of Farm to Market Road 1280 falls within the Crockett Independent School District. Austonio had a school until 1967, whose mascot was the owl.

Government

The Austonio Fire Department serves the community.

References

External links

Unincorporated communities in Houston County, Texas
Unincorporated communities in Texas